Events during the year 1104 in Italy.

Events
 Venetian Arsenal founded.

Sources

Years of the 12th century in Italy
Italy
Italy